Tommaso Barbieri (born 26 August 2002) is an Italian professional footballer who plays as a right-back for  club Juventus Next Gen.

Club career
On 11 September 2020, Barbieri joined Serie C side Juventus U23, the reserve team of Juventus, on a five-year contract. On 28 September, Barbieri made his debut for Juventus U23 in a 2–1 victory against Pro Sesto.

Career statistics

References

Notelist 

2002 births
Living people
Italian footballers
Italy youth international footballers
Association football fullbacks
Novara F.C. players
Juventus Next Gen players
Serie C players